The Chrysomyinae are a subfamily of Calliphoridae, or blow flies. According to Whitworth, the distinguishing characteristic of this subfamily is a setose stem vein.

Genera
Chloroprocta Wulp, 1896
Cochliomyia Townsend, 1915
Chrysomya Robineau-Desvoidy, 1830
Chrysopyrellia
Compsomyiops Townsend, 1918
Hemilucilia
Paralucilia Brauer & Bergenstamm, 1891
Phormia Robineau-Desvoidy, 1830
Phormiata
Protocalliphora Hough, 1899
Protophormia Townsend, 1908
Trypocalliphora Peus, 1960

References

Calliphoridae